Fernand Ledoux (born Jacques Joseph Félix Fernand Ledoux, 24 January 1897, Tirlemont – 21 September 1993, Villerville) was a French film and theatre actor of Belgian origin. He studied with Raphaël Duflos at the CNSAD, and began his career with small roles at the Comédie-Française.  He appeared in close to eighty films, with his best remembered role being the stationmaster Roubaud in Jean Renoir's La Bête humaine (1938), but he remained primarily a theatrical actor for the duration of his career.

Married to Fernande Thabuy, with whom he had four children, Ledoux was an amateur painter, and lived for many years at Pennedepie in Normandy.  Later he moved to Villerville, where he died and where he is buried.

Selected filmography

 L'homme à la barbiche (1933)
  (1934) as Flick 
 L'homme des Folies Bergère (1935) as François
 Mayerling (1936) as Philippe de Cobourg
 Taras Bulba (1936) as Tovkatch
 The Beloved Vagabond (1936) as Major Walters
  (1938) as Le doctuer
 Alert in the Mediterranean (1938) as Martin
 La Bête Humaine (1938) as Roubaud 
 Volpone (1941) as Corvino
  (1941) as Nicolas Rougemont
 First Ball (1941) as Michel Noblet
 L'assassinat du Père Noël (1941) as Noirgoutte, le maire
 Stormy Waters (1941) as Kerlo, le bosco
 Le Lit à colonnes (1942) as Porey-Cave
 Les Visiteurs du Soir (1942) as Le baron Hugues - le châtelain, père d'Anne
 La grande marnière  (1943) as Carvajan
  (1943) as Le maire
 It Happened at the Inn (1943) as Léopold Goupi dit Goupi-Mains-Rouges 
  (1943) as Auguste
 L'homme de Londres (1943) as Maloin
 Behold Beatrice (1944) as Le docteur Mauléon
 Girl with Grey Eyes (1945) as Le père Christophe
 The Bellman (1945) as Fabret, le 'lièvre'
 La fille du diable (1946) as Le docteur / The doctor
 The Sea Rose (1946) as Romain Jardehu
  (1947) as Le pharmacien Loiseau
 Eternal Conflict (1948) as Le professeur Janvier
 L'ombre (1948) as Firmin Blache
 White Paws (1949) as Jock Le Guen
 The Barton Mystery (1949) as Beverley
 Histoires extraordinaires à faire peur ou à faire rire... (1949) as Montrésor
 Monseigneur (1949) as Piétrefond
 Wolves Hunt at Night (1952) as Thomas Mollert - un membre du Deuxième Bureau
 La Bergère et le ramoneur (1952) as Le roi (voice)
 Act of Love (1953) as Fernand Lacaud
 Papa, maman, la bonne et moi (1954) as Fernand Langlois
  (1955) as Le Cadi
 Men in White (1955) as Dr. Delpuech
 Papa, maman, ma femme et moi (1955) as Fernand Langlois
 On ne badine pas avec l'amour (1955)
 Law of the Streets (1956) as Père Blain
 Les Aventures de Até L'Espiegle (1957) as Claes
 He Who Must Die (1957) as Priest Grigoris
  (1957) as Pierre Tiercelin
 Les Misérables (1958) as Monseigneur Myriel
 Cristina (1958) as Weiring as le père de Christine
 J'irai cracher sur vos tombes (1959) as Horace Chandley
 Cartagine in fiamme (1960)
 Recours en grâce (1960) as Le curé
 The Truth (1960) as Le médecin légiste
 The Big Gamble (1961) as Customs Official
 The Longest Day (1962) as Louis
 Freud: The Secret Passion (1962) as Dr. Charcot
 The Trial (1962) as Chief Clerk of the Law Court
 Le Glaive et la Balance (1963) as Le procureur 
 Up from the Beach (1965) as Barrelmaker
 La Communale (1965) as L'inspecteur
 Under the Sign of the Bull (1969) as Le juge
 Peau d'Âne (1970) as Le roi rouge, le seconde roi
 Moi y'en a vouloir des sous (1973) as Sauveur Chouras
 Bel Ordure (1973) as Le gardien de prison
 Les Granges brûlées (1973) as Le doyen des juges
 Les Chinois à Paris (1974) as Abel Frugebelle, de l'Acamédie Française
 Alice ou la Dernière Fugue (1977) as Le Vieil Homme et le Docteur
 À chacun son enfer (1977) as Le père
 Mille milliards de dollars (1982) as Guérande
 Les Misérables (1982) as Gillenormand

References

1897 births
1993 deaths
Belgian emigrants to France
Belgian male film actors
Belgian male silent film actors
20th-century Belgian male actors
French male film actors
French male silent film actors
French male stage actors
People from Tienen
Sociétaires of the Comédie-Française
20th-century French male actors